The Gardens by the Bay is a nature park spanning  in the Central Region of Singapore, adjacent to the Marina Reservoir. The park consists of three waterfront gardens: Bay South Garden (in Marina South), Bay East Garden (in Marina East) and Bay Central Garden (in Downtown Core and Kallang). The largest of the gardens is the Bay South Garden at  designed by Grant Associates. Its Flower Dome is the largest glass greenhouse in the world.

Gardens by the Bay was part of the nation's plans to transform its "Garden City" to a "City in a Garden", with the aim of raising the quality of life by enhancing greenery and flora in the city. First announced by Prime Minister Lee Hsien Loong at Singapore's National Day Rally in 2005, Gardens by the Bay was intended to be Singapore's premier urban outdoor recreation space and a national icon.

Being a popular tourist attraction in Singapore, the park received 6.4 million visitors in 2014, while topping its 20 millionth visitor mark in November 2015 and over 50 million in 2018.

Bay Central Garden
Bay Central Garden will act as a link between Bay South and Bay East Gardens.

Bay East Garden

An interim park was developed at Bay East Garden in support of the 2010 Summer Youth Olympics. The first phase of the garden was opened to the public in October 2011, allowing alternative access to the Marina Barrage.

It is designed as a series of large tropical leaf-shaped gardens, each with its own specific landscaping design, character and theme. There will be five water inlets aligned with the prevailing wind direction, maximizing and extending the shoreline while allowing wind and water to penetrate the site to help cool areas of activity around them.

Bay East Garden provides visitors with an unobstructed view of the city skyline. Upcoming developments of Bay East Garden will be based on the theme of water.

In 2018, Bay East Garden was designated as the future site of the Founders' Memorial.

Bay South Garden
Bay South Garden opened to the public on 29 June 2012.

The overall concept of its master plan by Grant Associates draws inspiration from an orchid as it is representative of the tropics and of Singapore, being the country's national flower, the Vanda 'Miss Joaquim'. The orchid takes root at the waterfront (conservatories), while the leaves (landforms), shoots (paths, roads and linkways) and secondary roots (water, energy and communication lines) then form an integrated network with blooms (theme gardens and Supertrees) at key intersections.

Conservatories

The conservatory complex at Gardens by the Bay comprises two cooled conservatories – the Flower Dome and the Cloud Forest, situated along the edge of Marina Reservoir. The conservatories, designed by WilkinsonEyre and Grant Associates, are intended to be an energy-efficient showcase of sustainable building technologies and to provide an all-weather edutainment space within the Gardens. Both are very large (around ) and the Flower Dome is the world's largest columnless glasshouse.

The construction of the glasshouses is special in two ways. First of all by being able to have such large a glass-roof without additional interior support (such as columns). Secondly, because the constructions aim strongly at minimizing the environmental footprint. Rainwater is collected from the surface and circulated in the cooling system which is connected to the Supertrees. The Supertrees are used both to vent hot air and to cool circulated water.

Flower Dome
The Flower Dome is the largest greenhouse in the world as listed in the 2015 Guinness Book of World Records at 1.2 hectares (3.0 acres) and replicates a cool-dry mediterranean climate. It features a changing display, the flower field, and eight other gardens, namely The Baobabs, Succulent Garden, Australian Garden, South African Garden, South American Garden, Olive Grove, California Garden and the Mediterranean Garden. These eight gardens exhibit exotic flowers and plants from the Mediterranean and semi-arid regions from five different continents.

Here is the list of some plants growing in the Flower Dome:

Cloud Forest

It features a  "Cloud Mountain." After ascending to the top by an elevator, visitors descend the mountain via a circular path which crosses underneath the  waterfall multiple times.

The "Cloud Mountain" itself is an intricate structure completely clad in epiphytes such as orchids, ferns, peacock ferns, spike- and clubmosses, bromeliads and anthuriums. The design by Grant Associates was inspired by the Maiden Hair Fungus and consists of a number of levels, each with a different theme, including The Lost World, The Cavern, The Waterfall View, The Crystal Mountain, The Cloud Forest Gallery, The Cloud Forest Theatre and The Secret Garden.

The following is a partial list of plants growing in the Cloud Forest:

In April 2022, a Maori kuwaha sculpture was presented to Singapore by Prime Minister Jacinda Ardern of New Zealand during her first official trip abroad since the 2020 pandemic. Representing strong friendship between New Zealand and Singapore, it is the work of master carvers from New Zealand's Maori Arts and Crafts institute.

Supertree Grove

They were conceived and designed by Grant Associates, with the imaginative engineering of Atelier One and Atelier Ten. They are vertical gardens that perform a multitude of functions, which include planting, shading and working as environmental engines for the gardens.

The Supertrees are home to enclaves of unique and exotic ferns, vines, orchids and also a vast collection of bromeliads such as Tillandsia, amongst other plants. They are fitted with environmental technologies that mimic the ecological function of trees: photovoltaic cells that harness solar energy which can be used for some of the functions of the Supertrees (such as lighting), similar to how trees photosynthesize, and collection of rainwater for use in irrigation and fountain displays, similar to how trees absorb rainwater for growth. The Supertrees also serve air intake and exhaust functions as part of the conservatories' cooling systems.

There is an elevated walkway, the OCBC Skyway, between two of the larger Supertrees for visitors to enjoy a panoramic aerial view of the Gardens. Every night, at 7:45pm and 8:45pm, the Supertree Grove comes alive with a coordinated light and music show known as the Garden Rhapsody. The accompanying music to the show changes every month or so, with certain themes such as A World of Wonder and A Night of Musical Theatre, which features excerpts/pieces from films like Jurassic Park and Pirates of the Caribbean.

There is also an available attraction called the Supertree Observatory, which opened on 27 December 2019. The observatory is housed inside the tallest Supertree which is 50 metres tall. It comprises three levels, the ground floor, the Observatory Space and the Open-Air Rooftop Deck. Visitors would take the lift up to the Observatory Space and thereafter take a flight of stairs up to the Rooftop Deck. The Observatory Space is located one level below the rooftop deck and it consists of an indoor area with full-height glass windows, as well as a peripheral outdoor walkway. Here visitors can also experience a message about the effects of climate change conveyed through digital media. The Open-Air Rooftop Deck, which is an open-air observation deck on the canopy of this Supertree, offers 360-degree unblocked views of the Gardens and the Marina Bay area.

Italy's Pavilion in Expo 2015, featured a structure called Albero Della Vita (or "Tree of Life" in Italian), which proved visually similar to Singapore's Supertrees.

Children's Garden
Designed by Grant Associates, which also designed Gardens by the Bay, the Children's Garden was fully funded by Far East Organization for $10 million. This attraction was opened on 21 January 2014. The children's garden is near the treehouse and the adventure trail. The adventure trail consists of trampolines, balancing beams, hanging bridges and more.

It is open from Tuesdays to Fridays from 10 a.m. to 7 p.m. and on Saturdays, Sundays and public holidays from 9 a.m. to 9 p.m. It is closed on Mondays, or on the next working day if Monday is a public holiday.

Horticultural themed gardens
There are two distinctly different sets of horticultural themed gardens which centre on the horticultural heritage of the various cultural groups in Singapore and on the biology and ecology of gardens and forests. They are an important part of the Gardens' edutainment programme, which aims to bring plant knowledge to the public.

The "Heritage Gardens" theme features gardens that highlight the various cultural groups in Singapore and the important role that plants play in their respective cultures, as well as the country's colonial history. It also focuses on economically important plants in Singapore and South East Asia. The four gardens are the Indian Garden, the Chinese Garden, the Malay Garden and the Colonial Garden.

The "World of Plants" theme emphasizes the web of relationships amongst the various plants within a fragile forest setting, showcasing the biodiversity of plant life on the planet. It consists of six subthemes illustrated by six "gardens", which are named Discovery, Web of Life, Fruits and Flowers, Understorey, World of Palms, and Secret Life of Trees.

Bayfront Plaza and Floral Fantasy

The Bayfront Plaza is the main entry precinct into the Gardens from Bayfront MRT station. It includes an attraction called Floral Fantasy which consists of four garden landscapes of floral artistry and a 4D ride experience. The  Floral Fantasy features floral artistry, as well as a 4D multimedia ride simulating the journey of a dragonfly's flight path through Gardens by the Bay. Included is also an indoor events space, the Bayfront Pavilion, a cafe and a pop-up markert on weekends.

Budget
The final construction cost for the project, not including the price of the land but including an access road, drainage works, and soil improvement, was within a $1.035 billion allocated budget. The annual operating cost was expected to be approximately $58 million, of which $28 million was for operation of the Conservatory buildings. The project received 1.7 million visitors between June and October 2012, who had free admission to most portions of the park but were required to purchase tickets for entering the Conservatories.

In 2006, an international competition for the design of the park was held, attracting more than 70 entries submitted by 170 firms from 24 countries. Two British firms – Grant Associates and Gustafson Porter – were awarded the contracts for the Bay South and Bay East Gardens respectively.

Alongside the lead designers Grant Associates, the design team for Bay South included WilkinsonEyre, Atelier Ten (environmental design consultants) and Atelier One (structural engineers). They were supported by a number of Singapore firms including CPG Consultants (architecture, civil and structural, mechanical and electrical), Meinhardt Infrastructure (civil and structural), Langdon & Seah (cost consultants) and PMLink (project management).

Transportation
The nearest Mass Rapid Transit (MRT) stations are Thomson-East Coast Line, which is Gardens by the Bay MRT station and Bayfront MRT station (Circle and Downtown Lines).

Bus Service 400 also serves the Gardens.

In popular culture 
The planet of Xandar in the film adaptation of Guardians of the Galaxy took inspiration from the location.
The documentary series Planet Earth II features the Supertree Grove in Episode 7, "A World of Wonder."
The park was featured in the 2015 film Hitman: Agent 47.
An entire mission is set within the gardens in the 2015 video game Call of Duty: Black Ops III.
The anime series Plastic Memories features locations inspired by the supertrees in the gardens.
The Supertree Grove in the park was featured in the 2018 film Crazy Rich Asians.
It is featured in the Mario Kart games Mario Kart Tour and Mario Kart 8 Deluxe as part of the Singapore Speedway racecourse.

Events
The center hosts events throughout the year. Dye-nosaur gardens was an immersive and educational event held at Gardens by the Bay in 2017 as part of the annual Children's Festival. This event involved several dinosaur inspired characters been found in the exhibits.

Gallery

See also
 List of parks in Singapore
 National Parks Board

References

External links

 Gardens by the Bay official website
 Gardens' Youtube Channel
 Grant Associates official website

2012 establishments in Singapore
Parks in Singapore
Tourist attractions in Singapore
Visionary environments
Greenhouses
Marina South
Marina East
Kallang